Jane Hughes (born 30 June 1948) is a Canadian former swimmer. She competed in the women's 400 metre freestyle at the 1964 Summer Olympics.

References

1948 births
Living people
Canadian female swimmers
Olympic swimmers of Canada
Swimmers at the 1964 Summer Olympics
Swimmers at the 1966 British Empire and Commonwealth Games
Commonwealth Games medallists in swimming
Commonwealth Games gold medallists for Canada
Commonwealth Games bronze medallists for Canada
Place of birth missing (living people)
Canadian female freestyle swimmers
20th-century Canadian women
Medallists at the 1966 British Empire and Commonwealth Games